Louwagie is a Belgian French surname.

People with the surname 

 Michel Louwagie (born 1956), Belgian sports manager
 Véronique Louwagie (born 1961), French politician

References 

Surnames
Surnames of Belgian origin
Surnames of French origin
French-language surnames